Ulises Mendívil Armenta (born 3 September 1980) is a Mexican former professional footballer who played as a striker.

External links
 
  
 
 
 
 

1980 births
Living people
Mexican expatriate footballers
Association football forwards
Atlas F.C. footballers
Chiapas F.C. footballers
C.F. Pachuca players
Atlante F.C. footballers
Club Necaxa footballers
Irapuato F.C. footballers
Altamira F.C. players
Xelajú MC players
Liga MX players
Ascenso MX players
Liga Premier de México players
Liga Nacional de Fútbol de Guatemala players
Mexican expatriate sportspeople in Guatemala
Expatriate footballers in Guatemala
Footballers from Baja California Sur
Mexican footballers
People from Comondú Municipality